Janine Shepherd,  is an Australian author, aerobatics pilot and former cross-country skier. Shepherd's career as an athlete ended when she sustained life-threatening injuries when hit by a truck during a training bike ride, while in contention to win Australia's first ever medal at the Winter Olympics. She survived and her story later became the focus of national attention, as well as a popular telemovie.

Biography
Shepherd had been an athletics champion as a child, and settled on cross-country skiing. After achieving success on the World circuit, she was given the offer of training with the Canadian team in the leadup to the 1988 Winter Olympics in Calgary. In 1986, Shepherd was cycling through the Blue Mountains in New South Wales as part of her training regime, when she was hit by a vehicle, suffering massive injuries. She suffered a broken neck and back, lost five litres of blood, had severe lacerations to her abdominal area. Her right leg was ripped open, her collarbone and five ribs were fractured, and she suffered serious internal injuries, but she survived. She was told that she would be reliant on a wheelchair for the rest of her life, and would never bear children.

Over the next few years, Shepherd recovered. While still remaining a partial paraplegic, she was ultimately able to walk again, and has three children. She gained her pilots license within a year of the accident, and went on to gain a commercial pilot's licence, then an instructor's license, eventually becoming a trained aerobatics flying instructor. She also became the first female director of the Civil Aviation Safety Authority.

Shepherd has written six books about her experiences. The first, Never Tell Me Never was made into a successful telemovie, with Shepherd being played by Claudia Karvan. She also has a bachelor's degree in Human Movement/Education.

Shepherd was a torchbearer at the 2000 Summer Paralympics in Sydney. Shepherd took up dressage in an attempt to represent Australia at the 2004 Summer Paralympics.

Shepherd is an ambassador for Spinal Cure Australia, and was appointed a Member of the Order of Australia in 2001 for her service to the community, her inspiration and her work in raising awareness of spinal cord research. In 1998, Shepherd was also awarded the title of an Outstanding Young Persons of the World, one of ten young people recognised annually by the Junior Chamber International, and currently resides in Wyoming in the United States.

Books
Defiant (2016)
The Gift of Acceptance (2012)
On My Own Two Feet (2007)
Reaching For Stars (1998)
Dare To Fly (1998)
Never Tell Me Never (1995)

References

External links
 Janine Shepherd's website

1962 births
20th-century Australian women writers
20th-century Australian writers
21st-century Australian women writers
21st-century Australian writers
Australian dressage riders
Australian women aviators
Australian female cross-country skiers
Australian memoirists
Australian motivational speakers
Australian motivational writers
Women motivational writers
Living people
Members of the Order of Australia
University of Technology Sydney alumni
Australian women memoirists